Gonks Go Beat is a 1964 British science fiction/musical fantasy film, directed by Robert Hartford-Davis. It stars Kenneth Connor and Frank Thornton. Gonks Go Beat is loosely based on the Romeo and Juliet storyline and features 16 musical numbers performed by a variety of artists, including Lulu and the Luvvers, The Nashville Teens and members of the Graham Bond Organisation including Ginger Baker, Jack Bruce and Dick Heckstall-Smith. Other musical contributors were – and remained – obscure. The film includes an early appearance by the actor Derek Thompson performing with his twin sister Elaine (credited as  Elain).

The title highlights the fad for gonk toys in mid 1960s Great Britain. The gonks appear in the opening title credits, whilst Lulu sings the theme song 'Chocolate Ice'.

Plot
At a point in the distant future, the inhabitants of Planet Earth have become divided into two factions who despise each other. In Beatland live the hip and trendy people who have long hair, dress in polo neck jumpers, jeans and sunglasses and listen to cool beat music. Their counterparts on Ballad Isle keep their hair short and tidy, wear button-down shirts and pressed slacks or floral dresses and twinsets, and listen exclusively to crooners. A musical competition is staged annually between the two sides, overseen by the neutral and powerful record company executive Mr. A&R (Thornton). For the rest of the year they regard each other with suspicion and antipathy, although they are not above sneaking into each other's territory to steal musical ideas.

Meanwhile, the overlords of a far-flung galaxy have been observing the squabblings and goings-on on Planet Earth with increasing exasperation. Finally, their patience with the earthlings is pushed beyond its limit and they decide to send their bungling representative Wilco Roger (Connor) to sort the situation out and bring about a reconciliation between the parties, with the warning that if he fails he'll be exiled to Planet Gonk, a fearsome and dreaded place where spherical furry soft toys shuffle around all day listening to Dixieland jazz.

On arrival, Wilco Roger makes contact with Mr. A&R. They're aware of a forbidden romance between a Beatland boy and a Ballad Isle girl, and use a combination of Mr. A&R's cunning and Wilco Roger's mystical powers to enable the couple to get together without fear and come up with a musical composition which will be acceptable to both sides. The time for the annual competition comes around, and the inhabitants are appalled when the Beatland boy and the Ballad Isle girl take to the stage together. But their song "Takes Two to Make Love" turns out to be the hit of the night, loved by both sides of the musical divide. Mr. A&R declares it the unquestioned winner and orders an end to the silliness as it has now been proved that everyone can live together and learn to appreciate all types of music.

Reputation
Gonks Go Beat was widely ridiculed on its original release as being so ill-advised and botched in execution as to have no appeal to any cinema audience demographic, whether of the younger or older generation. British film historian I.Q. Hunter
included Gonks Go Beat in his list of contenders for "the worst British film ever made". The film was released on DVD in the UK in 2007 by Optimum Home Entertainment, who tipped the wink to its intended audience by describing it as "the Plan 9 from Outer Space of film musicals", a description originally coined by the UK film critic Mark Kermode.

Cast

 Kenneth Connor as Wilco Roger
 Frank Thornton as Mr. A&R
 Barbara Brown as Helen
 Iain Gregory as Steve
 Terry Scott as PM
 Reginald Beckwith as Professor
 Gary Cockrell as Committee Man
 Jerry Desmonde as Great Galaxian
 Arthur Mullard as Drum Master
 Pamela Donald as Tutor
 Gillian French as Beatland Prime Minister
 Carlotta Barrow as Beat Girl
 Ann Chapman as Beat Girl
 Jo Cook as Beat Girl
 Babs Lord as Beat Girl
 Sarah Martin as Beat Girl

 Lyn Symonds as Beat Girl
 Lulu and the Luvvers as Themselves
 The Nashville Teens as Themselves
 The Vacqueros as Themselves
 The Trolls as Themselves
 The Long and the Short as Themselves
 Ray Lewis and the Trekker as Themselves
 Ginger Baker as himself
 Jack Bruce as himself
 Graham Bond as himself
 Dick Heckstall-Smith as himself
 John McLaughlin as himself
 Andy White as himself
 Derek Thompson as Singer
 Elain Thompson as Singer
 Alan David as Singer

Reception
 In The Spinning Image Graeme Clark wrote, "time has been kinder to its daft novelty than a few of its peers, although that doesn't mean it's any good, it has just grown quainter with age."
 TV Guide gave the film one and a half stars and wrote, "only fans of obscure mod bands will enjoy this teen exploitation item."
 "Cinedelica" wrote, "a fairly enjoyable, if very dated, slice of period silliness."

References

External links
 
 
 Gonks Go Beat at BFI Film & TV Database

1965 films
British comedy films
British musical films
British science fiction films
Fantasy music
Science fiction musical films
1960s musical films
Films directed by Robert Hartford-Davis
Films based on Romeo and Juliet
1960s English-language films
1960s British films